The Torneio Rio – São Paulo was a traditional Brazilian football competition contested between São Paulo and Rio de Janeiro teams from 1933 to 1966, in 1993 and from 1997 to 2002.

Organized by the state football associations of the state of São Paulo and the city of Rio de Janeiro (after unification of the states of Guanabara and Rio de Janeiro), the official name of the tournament became the Torneio Roberto Gomes Pedrosa in 1954, named after former goalkeeper of the Brazilian national team and president of the São Paulo Football Association who died in that year. This name was not broadly popularized used until 1967 when the tournament was first opened to teams from the states of Minas Gerais, Paraná and Rio Grande do Sul, and later also from Pernambuco and Bahia. The Torneio Roberto Gomes Pedrosa, also often referred to as Taça de Prata (Silver Cup) and contested until 1970, is generally considered the predecessor of the Brazilian Football Championship which started in 1971.

Due to its continental size and historical peculiarities, Brazil has a short history of national competitions, with the modern Campeonato Brasileiro starting in 1971 supported by the military regime and only made possible due to the improvements in civil aviation and air transport. In 2010, the CBF officially recognized the expanded Torneio Roberto Gomes Pedrosa from 1967 to 1970 as a legitimate national championship, although as of 2022, the CBF does not officially recognize the pre-1967 Torneio Rio – São Paulo as a national championship. In the era prior to officially recognized national competition, given that the majority of Brazil's strongest teams were located in São Paulo and Rio de Janeiro, some historians consider that up until 1959, despite its schedule irregularity, the Torneio Rio – São Paulo was the most prestigious title for any team to claim outside of state championships.

From 2000 to 2002, the Torneio Rio – São Paulo champions were granted qualification to the Copa dos Campeões.

List of champions

Round-robin format

Knockout format

Titles by team

Titles by state

Participations

Includes 1934 edition

Top Scorers

External links
 Tournament at RSSSF
 Matches which decided Rio – São Paulo Tournament at RSSSF
 Gazeta Esportiva's History Prior to the Brasileirão
 Gazeta Esportiva's History of the Rio – SP Tournament

Rio-São Paulo
Football competitions in Rio de Janeiro (state)
Football competitions in São Paulo (state)